Dević is a common Bosnian, Croatian and Serbian surname. It may refer to:

 Borislav Dević (b. 1963), Serbian athlete
 Goran Dević (b. 1971), Croatian film director
 Igor Dević (b. 1984), Croatian footballer
 Marko Dević (b. 1983), Serbian-Ukrainian footballer
 Milan Dević (b. 1974), Serbian footballer
 Vukašin Dević (b. 1984), Serbian footballer

See also
Devič, a Serb Orthodox abbey in Kosovo
Devic (disambiguation)

Croatian surnames
Serbian surnames
Slavic-language surnames